Moro is a surname of Italian descent. Notable people with the surname include:

 House of Moro, noble family of the Republic of Venice. 

Aldo Moro (1916–1978), Italian politician and prime minister
Anabel Moro (born 1979), Argentine Paralympic swimmer
Andrea Moro (born 1962) Italian linguist and neuroscientist
Anton Moro (1687-1764) Italian geologist
Berta Betanzos Moro (born 1988), Spanish Olympic sports sailor
Cristoforo Moro (1390-1471), 67th Doge of Venice
Daniel Moro (born 1973), Spanish Olympic water polo champion
Ernst Moro (1874–1951), Austrian physician and pediatrician
Fabio Moro (born 1975), Italian footballer
Fabrizio Moro (born 1975), Italian singer 
Guerrino Moro (born 1982), Canadian Olympic athlete
Iván Moro (born 1974), Spanish Olympic water polo champion
Lisa Moro (born 1981), Australian Olympic artistic gymnast
Luis Fernando Moro (born 1987), Spanish Olympic athlete
Marie Rose Moro (born 1961), Spanish psychiatrist 
Nikola Moro (born 1998), Croatian footballer
Oscar Moro (1948-2006), Argentine rock musician
Paola Moro (born 1952), Italian Olympic distance runner 
Peter Moro, CBE (1911-1998), German-British architect 
Roberto Moro (born 1964), Argentinian politician
Sara Moro (born 1984), Spanish Olympic artistic gymnast 
Sérgio Moro (born 1972), Brazilian Minister for Justice and federal judge
Simone Moro (born 1967), Italian mountain climber
Stefanina Moro (1927-1944), Italian partisan

Italian-language surnames